Maxime Do Couto Teixeira (born 13 December 1996) is a French professional footballer who plays as a winger for Sochaux.

Club career
Do Couto is a youth exponent from Tours. He made his Ligue 2 debut on 30 August 2014 against Angers SCO in a 1–2 away win.  He had a brief stint at Avoine OCC before moving to Ukraine with Olimpik Donetsk from 2018 to 2021. On 22 June 2021, he transferred back to France with Sochaux in the Ligue 2.

International career
Born in France, Do Couto is of Cameroonian and Portuguese descent. He is a youth international for France, having represented the France U19s in 2014.

References

External links

 

1996 births
Living people
Sportspeople from Neuilly-sur-Seine
French footballers
France youth international footballers
French people of Portuguese descent
French sportspeople of Cameroonian descent
Association football forwards
Tours FC players
FC Olimpik Donetsk players
FC Sochaux-Montbéliard players
Ligue 2 players
Ukrainian Premier League players
Championnat National 3 players
French expatriate footballers
Expatriate footballers in Ukraine
French expatriate sportspeople in Ukraine
Footballers from Hauts-de-Seine